Trémeau may refer to:

 Alphonse Trémeau de Rochebrune (1836–1912), French biologist
 Paul Tremo (1734–1810), German-Polish chef